Fusion!: Wes Montgomery with Strings is an album by the American jazz guitarist Wes Montgomery, released in 1963.

History
Fusion was the first album Montgomery recorded with a string section. This would become more commonplace on his later releases on the Verve and A&M labels.

It has been reissued in the Original Jazz Classics series with additional alternate takes and all the tracks are also available on the Wes Montgomery compilation CD-set The Complete Riverside Recordings.

Reception 

In his AllMusic review, music critic Scott Yanow praised the album: "As with his later albums, Montgomery's guitar solos here are brief and melodic but the jazz content is fairly high even if the emphasis is (with the exception of 'Tune Up') on ballads... worth picking up; the music is quite pretty and pleasing."

Track listing
"All the Way" (Jimmy Van Heusen, Sammy Cahn) – 2:39
"Pretty Blue" (Wes Montgomery) – 3:40
"Pretty Blue" [Alternate take] (Montgomery) – 2:58
"In the Wee Small Hours of the Morning" (Mann, Hilliard) – 2:51
"Prelude to a Kiss" (Duke Ellington, Irving Mills, Irving Gordon) – 3:08
"The Girl Next Door" (Ralph Blane, Hugh Martin) – 3:08
"My Romance" (Richard Rodgers, Lorenz Hart) – 2:31
"God Bless the Child" (Billie Holiday, Arthur Herzog Jr.) – 3:19
"Tune Up" (Miles Davis) – 3:14
"Tune Up" [Alternate take] (Davis) – 5:09
"Tune Up" [Alternate take] (Davis) – 4:44
"Somewhere" (Leonard Bernstein, Stephen Sondheim) – 3:30
"Baubles, Bangles & Beads" (George Forrest, Robert Wright, Alexander Borodin) – 2:19

Personnel
 Wes Montgomery – guitar
 Milt Hinton – bass
 Kenny Burrell – guitar
 Dick Hyman – piano, celesta
 Hank Jones – piano, celesta
 Osie Johnson – drums
 Phil Bodner – woodwinds
 Burt Fisch – viola
 Ralph Hersh – viola
 Alfred Brown – viola
 Leo Kruczek – violin
 Harry Lookofsky – violin
 Mac Ceppos – violin
 Winston Collymore – violin
 Arnold Eidus – violin
 David Nadien – violin
 Gene Orloff – violin, concert master
 Raoul Poliakin – violin
 Samuel Rand – violin
 Sylvan Shulman – violin
 Paul Winter – violin
 Isadore Zir – violin
 George Ricci – cello
 Lucien Schmit – cello
 Charles McCracken – cello
 Kermit Moore – cello
 Margaret Ross – harp
 Gloria Agostini – harp

Production notes:
 Orrin Keepnews – producer
 Ray Fowler – engineer
 Jimmy Jones – conductor, arranger

References

External links
Jazz Discography

1963 albums
Wes Montgomery albums
Albums produced by Orrin Keepnews
Riverside Records albums
Albums arranged by Jimmy Jones (pianist)
Albums conducted by Jimmy Jones (pianist)